K33LN-D, virtual and UHF digital channel 33, is a low-power, Class A QVC-affiliated television station licensed to Minneapolis, Minnesota, United States. The station is owned by HC2 Holdings. K33LN-D's transmitter is located atop the IDS Center. The station was owned by 3ABN until 2017, when it was included in a $9.6 million sale of 14 stations to HC2 Holdings.

History

In October 2018, K33LN-D switched its programming affiliations to the network slate previously carried by fellow HC2 owned station KMBD-LD, reducing the 3ABN carriage on channel 33 to a single subchannel.

Subchannels

The station's signal is multiplexed:

References

External links
 K33LN Station Info
 RabbitEars.info website

Television channels and stations established in 1990
Low-power television stations in the United States
Television stations in Minneapolis–Saint Paul
1990 establishments in Minnesota
Innovate Corp.
Classic Reruns TV affiliates